Lebns Fragn (Life questions, Yiddish: לעבנס־פֿראַגן) was a Yiddish, Bundist-orientated magazine, published bimonthly in Israel. The first issue appeared in May 1951, under the editorship of Isachar Artuski. The responsibility for editing was shared by Ben-Zion ("Bentsl") Tsalevitsh (1883–1967). Tsalevitsh had come to Palestine in 1922, after having been active for many years in the Bund in Białystok, and Artuski, a member of the Warsaw Bund since 1935, arrived in Palestine during the Second World War.

After Artuski's death in November 1971, Yitzkhok Luden became editor. The last issue was published in April, 2014.

References

External links
 Magazine Website
 a scanned front page of Lebns Fragn
Online, searchable Lebns Fragn editions from the Historical Jewish Press

Bi-monthly magazines
Bundism
Defunct magazines published in Israel
Jewish anti-Zionism in Israel
Jewish socialism
Magazines published in Israel
Magazines established in 1951
Magazines disestablished in 2014
Non-Hebrew-language mass media in Israel
Polish-Jewish culture in Israel
Secular Jewish culture in Israel
Socialism in Israel
Yiddish periodicals
Yiddish culture in Tel Aviv